Chantal Hagel (born 20 July 1998) is a German footballer who plays as a central midfielder for 1899 Hoffenheim and the Germany women's national team.

Career
Hagel made her international debut for Germany in the 2022 Arnold Clark Cup on 20 February 2022, coming on as a substitute in the 82nd minute for Fabienne Dongus against Canada. The match finished as a 1–0 loss.

Career statistics

International

References

External links
 
 
 
 
 Chantal Hagel at tsg-hoffenheim.de 

1998 births
Living people
People from Calw
Sportspeople from Karlsruhe (region)
Footballers from Baden-Württemberg
German women's footballers
Germany women's international footballers
Women's association football forwards
SC Freiburg (women) players
TSG 1899 Hoffenheim (women) players
Frauen-Bundesliga players
2. Frauen-Bundesliga players